Bet Tzedek is an American non-profit human and poverty rights organization based in Los Angeles, California. 

Bet Tzedek embraces the fundamental commitment of achieving full and equal access to justice for all people. Their social justice philosophy was rooted in a central tenet of Jewish law and teaching: "Tzedek, tzedek tirdof – Justice, justice you shall pursue."

The organization offers support to the nearly two million residents of L.A. who live in poverty.

History
Bet Tzedek was founded in 1974 by a group of Jewish attorneys determined to address the human rights issues and humanitarian needs endemic to Los Angeles. The group's volunteer attorneys provided free legal representation to Los Angeles residents who would otherwise not be able to afford it. As the need skyrocketed throughout the mid-1970s, Bet Tzedek rapidly evolved from a part-time, volunteer-run organization into a comprehensive, full-service center providing free legal aid to all of Los Angeles.

By 1977, Bet Tzedek's lawyers had won several landmark cases, including successfully blocking the illegal evictions of low-income elderly residents of Venice, California's Cadillac Hotel. Bet Tzedek's victory resulted in health and safety renovations and guaranteed the residents' right to remain at the hotel for the rest of their lives at their current low rents.   
  
In 1984, Bet Tzedek won a landmark decision that provided support to thousands of low-income, elderly Holocaust survivors.  The U.S. Court of Appeals for the 9th Circuit ruled in favor of Felicia Grunfeder, a Bet Tzedek client and Holocaust survivor who had been denied disability benefits because she received a small survivors’ reparations payment.  After multiple appeals, the federal courts ruled that Holocaust reparations payments cannot preclude disability payments, and state and federal legislation subsequently codified the decision.

Bet Tzedek provided emergency legal services during and in the aftermath of the 1992 Los Angeles riots, when four LAPD officers were acquitted in the beating of black motorist Rodney King.  The issues central to the riots – racial profiling, civil rights abuses, endemic poverty, poor housing conditions, and unemployment – were also central to Bet Tzedek's work. Advocates continued to see clients at senior centers in the central city during the riots. L.A. Mayor Tom Bradley later commended Bet Tzedek for providing services during and after the civil unrest. 

In the early 1990s, Bet Tzedek sued a national HMO alleging fraud and deceptive sales practices in the HMO's racially targeted victimization of elderly Spanish-speaking enrollees. Ensuing media coverage prompted a federal investigation and a stockholder suit against the company and Bet Tzedek successfully settled the underlying case.

Following the 1994 Northridge earthquake, Bet Tzedek provided emergency assistance to earthquake victims with housing issues, home improvement fraud, and Federal Emergency Management Agency (FEMA) claims. For low-income victims, Bet Tzedek was the sole source of free advocacy.

In 1995, Bet Tzedek initiatives revealed disturbingly negligent conditions in Los Angeles area nursing homes. To address this, Bet Tzedek sponsored major state legislation that provided new standards and protections for low-income elderly residents who were most at risk for elder abuse. In 1999, Bet Tzedek's lawsuit against Hillhaven, one of the largest nursing home chains in the country, resulted in the company agreeing to change business practices that violated state and federal law and led to financial hardship for residents and their families.

In 1998, Bet Tzedek brought a major class-action suit with pro bono counsel against 16 European-based insurance companies who refused to honor insurance policies purchased by Jews who perished in the Holocaust. With up to 60% of all survivors living in poverty, this advocacy provided desperately needed resources. This advocacy continues to this day, as Bet Tzedek assists survivors with issues centered in the governments of former Nazi nations.

In 2001, when 61% of Los Angeles apparel contractors were violating wage and hour laws, Bet Tzedek opened the Employment Rights Project in the San Fernando Valley in response to the growing numbers of “working poor” in Los Angeles, who remained in poverty despite working full-time as garment workers, day laborers, domestics, carwash employees, and gardeners.

In 2002, Bet Tzedek investigated the city's most-convicted slumlord, discovering multiple fraudulent practices. After filing a lawsuit, Bet Tzedek obtained a major settlement requiring the slumlord to pay $1 million to the City of L.A. and submit to ongoing monitoring of his business practices by Bet Tzedek.

In 2004, Bet Tzedek helped pass a new state law and established a new legal precedent protecting garment workers, ensuring the safety and proper treatment of hundreds of thousands of workers in L.A. alone.

In 2012, Bet Tzedek moved from its longtime headquarters in Los Angeles' historically Jewish Fairfax District to a new headquarters on Wilshire Boulevard in Koreatown.  The move was motivated in part because Bet Tzedek's services were being provided mainly to non-Jews, and because the organization desired a more centralized location.

Services and programs
Bet Tzedek's services include legal advice, counseling and representation at trials, administrative hearings, and appeals.  Bet Tzedek also offers educational programs to clients and other service providers. Services at Bet Tzedek are provided through the following programs:

Consumer fraud
Bet Tzedek's Consumer Protection Unit litigates consumer fraud cases in a variety of areas, including home equity fraud, telemarketing, automobile financing, and health care marketing, and door-to-door sales.  Additionally the Consumer Protection Unit provides educational programs throughout Los Angeles County to help residents recognize and avoid fraud. Bet Tzedek also collaborates with various law enforcement agencies and legal services providers to target the most notorious scam artists.

Employment rights
Bet Tzedek's Employment Rights Project advocates on behalf of a variety of low-wage workers, including Day Laborers, domestic workers, and those working in the garment, construction, car wash, restaurant and janitorial industries. The Project represents low-wage workers, regardless of their immigration status, who have been illegally denied wages that they have earned.  Client services range from brief advice, counseling and informal advocacy, to representation in hearings before the California Labor Commissioner and litigation in state and federal courts.

Family Caregiver Project
 AARP and the National Alliance for Caregiving estimate that 4.3 million adults in the State of California provide unpaid care to an adult relative or friend.  The total value of familycaregiving is estimated at $276 billion. Caregivers usually do not quit their jobs, or leave their personal relationships, to offer care to their relatives.  The Family Caregiving Project at Bet Tzedek responds by providing expert legal counsel, advice and representation to English, Spanish and Chinese speaking adults who care for a loved-one afflicted with Alzheimer's disease, dementia or other debilitating illnesses.

Director of the Bet Tzedek Legal Services Family Caregiver Project, Janet Moris, serves caregivers throughout Los Angeles County with essential education, referrals and legal services. Bet Tzedek Legal Services staff make presentations to over 2,000 family members, social workers, and service professionals annually.

Government benefits
Bet Tzedek represents clients on a range of state and federal government benefits, including Social Security, Medi-Cal, Medicare, SSI/SSDI (Disability), in-home supportive services, veterans' benefits, CalWORKS, Supplemental Nutrition Assistance Program (food stamps), WIC, and Adoption Assistance, KinGAP. Bet Tzedek represents clients in appeals, helps clients to apply for benefits, and identifies appropriate programs.

Holocaust reparations
Bet Tzedek Legal Services is the only agency in the world that offers free assistance to Holocaust survivors applying for reparations, pensions and other benefits from Germany and other European countries. Bet Tzedek has also worked on other survivor issues, including Holocaust-era insurance coverage, the effect of reparations on eligibility for public benefits, and the waiver of wire transfer fees for survivors who receive reparations.

Housing
The Housing Law Project provides legal assistance to tenants in Los Angeles County facing eviction actions and illegal housing conditions. The elderly and persons with disabilities are the focus of much of the service because they are often targeted for eviction in order to circumvent the rent stabilization laws and bring in new tenants at higher rents. The project's attorney represents these clients, develops solutions to systematic housing legal problems, and recruits, trains, and supervises a network of volunteer attorneys.

Sydney M. Irmas Housing Conditions Project
Bet Tzedek's Sydney M. Irmas Housing Conditions Project is underwritten by a grant from the Irmas Family Foundation to help low-income families secure safe, affordable housing. In 2001, the Irmas Project brought landmark litigation on behalf of tenants' rights group Inquilinos Unidos against one of the most notorious landlords in Los Angeles. The lawsuit was later joined by the Los Angeles City Attorney's office, and the law firm of Gibson, Dunn & Crutcher served as pro bono counsel on the suit. This case represented a landmark victory in the battle against landlords who subject their tenants to substandard health and safety conditions and set a significant precedent in the ability of tenants' groups to successfully prosecute owners attempting to hide behind a web of business identities.

Eviction Defense Project
The Eviction Defense Project at Bet Tzedek Legal Services provides advice, counsel and representation those in need of assistance. Bet Tzedek accepts eviction cases on an individual basis, and screens all cases for merit. Annually, Bet Tzedek serves as counsel for 100 families who face illegal eviction from their apartments, with a success rate of over 90 percent.

Kinship care
Bet Tzedek Legal Services created the Kinship Care Project in 2002 to address the needs of the more than 88,000 children in Los Angeles County who live with their grandparents. The Kinship Care Project offers a variety of services to grandparents and others who are raising their young family members. For the last five years, Bet Tzedek has offered free legal services to these families.

Bet Tzedek's Kinship Care Project is unique in Los Angeles County, as no other service provider focuses on this population. Additionally, Bet Tzedek Legal Services published Southern California's first comprehensive guide for relative caregivers, Caring for a Relative's Child. The guide is available in both English and Spanish, and is the primary resource of its kind used by social workers throughout Los Angeles County.

Nursing Home Advocacy Project
The Nursing Home Advocacy Project (NHAP) has been a signature program that has shaped the development of Bet Tzedek's elderlaw practice. The project was established in response to a need for effective legal assistance for residents of nursing homes. Today, Bet Tzedek works to improve the quality of care for the institutionalized elderly and provides legal protection against abuse and neglect through advice, education, advocacy, and litigation. Among the many milestones in NHAP's history are:
 Comprehensive legislation to reform admissions and discharge practices and financial responsibility and billing practices by nursing homes.
 A landmark study of Los Angeles County nursing homes, which brought to light serious noncompliance with state and federal regulations and prompted the passage of reform legislation 
 Major litigation against a national nursing home chain for fraudulent admissions contracts, resulting in sweeping national changes.

NHAP has published the following consumer guides: "The Nursing Home Companion" (in English and Spanish); "If Only I Had Known: Misrepresentations Made by Nursing Homes" (published with a grant from the Archstone Foundation), and "How to Get Care From a Residential Care Facility". Over 200,000 copies of these guides have been distributed nationally, and they remain the first resource consulted by ombudspersons throughout California.

Senior legal services
For more than two decades, Bet Tzedek has served the legal needs of low-income seniors in Los Angeles. Bet Tzedek is the exclusive provider of free legal services to low-income seniors through contracts with the City and County of Los Angeles.  Bet Tzedek staff address legal issues that affect seniors such as consumer fraud and elder abuse, nursing homes and residential care facilities, public benefits, family and kinship caregiver needs, and housing. Bet Tzedek staff regularly meet with clients at more than 30 senior centers in Greater Los Angeles County. In addition to providing one-on-one services, Bet Tzedek has developed four new legal clinics designed to help seniors help themselves. Each clinic provides an overview of a particular legal issue and guides seniors in the preparation of the appropriate legal documents.

References

Jewish charities based in the United States
Legal aid
Non-profit organizations based in Los Angeles
United States elder law
Charities based in California